The fulvous-crested tanager (Tachyphonus surinamus) is a species of bird in the family Thraupidae, the tanagers.

It is found in Brazil, Colombia, Ecuador, French Guiana, Guyana, Peru, Suriname, and Venezuela.
Its natural habitat is subtropical or tropical moist lowland forests.

The fulvous-crested tanager is found in the entire Amazon Basin, but only the downstream third of the southern half, in the southeast and southwest. The species ranges into the Guianas in the northeast, and the Orinoco River drainage of Venezuela in the northwest; for its range limit, it is not found in the western or northern regions of the Orinoco drainage.

Taxonomy
In 1760 the French zoologist Mathurin Jacques Brisson included a description of the fulvous-crested tanager in the supplement to his Ornithologie based on a specimen collected Suriname. He used the French name Le merle de Surinam and the Latin name Merula surinamensis. Although Brisson coined Latin names, these do not conform to the binomial system and are not recognised by the International Commission on Zoological Nomenclature. When in 1766 the Swedish naturalist Carl Linnaeus updated his Systema Naturae for the twelfth edition he added 240 species that had been previously described by Brisson in his Ornithologie. One of these was the fulvous-crested tanager. Linnaeus included a terse description, coined the binomial name Turdus surinamus and cited Brisson's work.  The present genus Tachyphonus was introduced by the French ornithologist Louis Pierre Vieillot in 1816. There are four subspecies.

References

External links
Fulvous-crested Tanager photo gallery VIREO Photo-High Res

Tachyphonus
Birds of the Amazon Basin
Birds of Brazil
Birds of the Guianas
Birds of Venezuela
Birds of Colombia
Birds of Ecuador
Birds of Peru
Birds described in 1766
Taxa named by Carl Linnaeus
Taxonomy articles created by Polbot
Taxobox binomials not recognized by IUCN